Balbo is a surname.

Notable people with the surname
 Abel Balbo (born 1966), Argentine football manager
 Cesare Balbo (1789–1853), Count of Vinadio, Italian writer and statesman
 Ennio Balbo (1922–1989), Italian film actor
 Giuseppe Balbo (1902–1980), Italian painter
 Italo Balbo (1896–1940), Italian Blackshirt leader, Italy's Marshal of the Air Force, Governor-General of Libya and Commander-in-Chief of Italian North Africa
 Julien Balbo (born 1979), French squash player
 Laura Balbo (born 1933), Italian sociologist and politician
 Michael Balbo (15th century), Cretan rabbi and poet
 Ned Balbo (born 1959), American poet, translator and essayist
 Rosángela Balbó (1941–2011), Mexican-Italian born actress

See also
 Giambalvo

Surnames of Italian origin